In the 2020–21 season, Partizan NIS Belgrade competed in the Serbian League, Radivoj Korać Cup, Adriatic League and EuroCup.

It was the first season after the 1997–98 season that the club missed any league of cup final.

Players

Current roster

Players with multiple nationalities
   Marcus Paige

Depth chart

On loan

Roster changes

In

|}

Out

|}

Pre-season and friendlies

Adriatic League

Regular season

Matches

EuroCup

Regular season

Group B

Matches

Top 16: Group F

Matches

Serbian Super League

Radivoj Korać Cup

Individual awards

Adriatic League

MVP of the Round

 Ognjen Jaramaz – Round 13

MVP of the Month

 Rashawn Thomas – April

References

External links
 Official website
 Partizan at ABA League.com

KK Partizan seasons
Partizan
Partizan
Partizan